Neapoli–Sykies is a municipality of the Thessaloniki Urban Area in the regional unit of Thessaloniki, Central Macedonia, Greece and part of the Thessaloniki Urban Area. The seat of the municipality is in Sykies. The municipality has an area of 12.903 km2.

Municipality
The municipality Neapoli–Sykies was formed at the 2011 local government reform by the merger of the following 4 former municipalities, that became municipal units:
Agios Pavlos
Neapoli
Pefka
Sykies

References

Municipalities of Central Macedonia
Populated places in Thessaloniki (regional unit)